William Matthew Outen (2 July 1883 – 27 January 1930) was an Australian rules footballer who played with St Kilda in the Victorian Football League (VFL) and Williamstown in the Victorian Football Association (VFA).

Family
The second of the six children of Charles George Outen (1856-1929), and Bridget Outen, née Cross, William Matthew Outen was born at Williamstown, Victoria on 2 July 1883.
 His brother, Charles Whynam "Wyn" Outen (1880-1964), played for St Klda in the VFL and for Williamstown in the VFA; Wyn played (alongside his brother Matt) in the Willamstown First XVIII team that won the 1907 VFA premiership.
 His brother, John Edward "Jack" Outen (1890-1963), played in one First XVIII game for Williamstown (alongside his brother Matt) in 1909.
 His brother, Percy Ernest Hatherley Outen (1898-1986), played in 5 First XVIII games for Williamstown in the VFA in 1928.<ref>P.E. Outen in The VFA Project'.</ref>
 His brother, Albert Henry "Alby" Outen (1902-1972), played for Footscray in both the VFA and the VFL. 
 His nephew, Reginald Whynam Outen (1913-1999),Back in the Four, The Williamstown Chronicle, (Saturday, 12 August 1939), p.6. the son of Wyn Outen, was an emergency in Williamstown's 1939 premiership team, after earlier playing with Collingwood and Melbourne Seconds.
 His nephew, Albert Keith "Alby" Outen (1936-2010), the son of Alby Outen, played 2 games with Footscray in 1954 before transferring to Williamstown and playing in their 1955 and 1956 premiership teams.

He married Lucy Elizabeth Guthrie (1869-1940), née Buchanan, the former Mrs. James Hickey Guthrie, in 1917.Obituary: Mrs. L.E. Outen, The Williamstown Chronicle, (Saturday, 4 May 1940), p.4.

Death
He died at Williamstown, Victoria on 27 January 1930.Obituary: Mr. William Matthew Outen, The Williamstown Chronicle, (Saturday, 8 February 1930), p.3.

 Notes 

References
 The Williamstown Football Team, The Leader, (Saturday, 20 June 1908, p.27.
 

 External links 
 
 
 Matt Outen at The VFA Project''.

1883 births
1930 deaths
Australian rules footballers from Melbourne
St Kilda Football Club players
Williamstown Football Club players
People from Williamstown, Victoria